The 2001–02 St. Louis Blues season was the 35th for the franchise in St. Louis, Missouri. The Blues finished the regular-season with a record of 43 wins, 27 losses, 8 ties and 4 overtime losses, enough for 98 points. The Blues qualified for the playoffs for the 23rd consecutive season, and defeated the Chicago Blackhawks, four games to one, in the Western Conference Quarterfinals before losing the Western Conference Semifinals to the eventual Stanley Cup Champion Detroit Red Wings, also in five games.

Off-season

Regular season

Final standings

Playoffs

Schedule and results

Regular season

|- align="center" 
|1||T||October 4, 2001||3–3 OT|| align="left"| @ Columbus Blue Jackets (2001–02) ||0–0–1–0 || 
|- align="center" 
|2||T||October 6, 2001||2–2 OT|| align="left"| @ Nashville Predators (2001–02) ||0–0–2–0 || 
|- align="center" bgcolor="#FFBBBB"
|3||L||October 11, 2001||5–6 || align="left"|  Los Angeles Kings (2001–02) ||0–1–2–0 || 
|- align="center" bgcolor="#CCFFCC" 
|4||W||October 13, 2001||5–2 || align="left"| @ Toronto Maple Leafs (2001–02) ||1–1–2–0 || 
|- align="center" 
|5||T||October 17, 2001||2–2 OT|| align="left"|  Dallas Stars (2001–02) ||1–1–3–0 || 
|- align="center" bgcolor="#CCFFCC" 
|6||W||October 19, 2001||3–2 OT|| align="left"| @ Minnesota Wild (2001–02) ||2–1–3–0 || 
|- align="center" bgcolor="#CCFFCC" 
|7||W||October 20, 2001||2–1 OT|| align="left"|  Pittsburgh Penguins (2001–02) ||3–1–3–0 || 
|- align="center" bgcolor="#FFBBBB"
|8||L||October 22, 2001||2–3 || align="left"|  Calgary Flames (2001–02) ||3–2–3–0 || 
|- align="center" bgcolor="#CCFFCC" 
|9||W||October 25, 2001||5–1 || align="left"|  New York Rangers (2001–02) ||4–2–3–0 || 
|- align="center" bgcolor="#FFBBBB"
|10||L||October 27, 2001||1–4 || align="left"| @ Ottawa Senators (2001–02) ||4–3–3–0 || 
|- align="center" bgcolor="#CCFFCC" 
|11||W||October 31, 2001||1–0 || align="left"| @ Colorado Avalanche (2001–02) ||5–3–3–0 || 
|-

|- align="center" bgcolor="#CCFFCC" 
|12||W||November 1, 2001||4–3 || align="left"|  Carolina Hurricanes (2001–02) ||6–3–3–0 || 
|- align="center" bgcolor="#CCFFCC" 
|13||W||November 3, 2001||4–1 || align="left"|  Washington Capitals (2001–02) ||7–3–3–0 || 
|- align="center" bgcolor="#FFBBBB"
|14||L||November 6, 2001||1–4 || align="left"|  San Jose Sharks (2001–02) ||7–4–3–0 || 
|- align="center" bgcolor="#CCFFCC" 
|15||W||November 8, 2001||3–1 || align="left"|  Vancouver Canucks (2001–02) ||8–4–3–0 || 
|- align="center" bgcolor="#CCFFCC" 
|16||W||November 10, 2001||4–1 || align="left"|  Phoenix Coyotes (2001–02) ||9–4–3–0 || 
|- align="center" bgcolor="#FF6F6F"
|17||OTL||November 13, 2001||2–3 OT|| align="left"| @ Columbus Blue Jackets (2001–02) ||9–4–3–1 || 
|- align="center" bgcolor="#FFBBBB"
|18||L||November 15, 2001||1–2 || align="left"| @ Vancouver Canucks (2001–02) ||9–5–3–1 || 
|- align="center" bgcolor="#FFBBBB"
|19||L||November 17, 2001||0–2 || align="left"| @ Calgary Flames (2001–02) ||9–6–3–1 || 
|- align="center" bgcolor="#FFBBBB"
|20||L||November 20, 2001||0–2 || align="left"| @ Edmonton Oilers (2001–02) ||9–7–3–1 || 
|- align="center" bgcolor="#FFBBBB"
|21||L||November 23, 2001||1–3 || align="left"| @ Detroit Red Wings (2001–02) ||9–8–3–1 || 
|- align="center" bgcolor="#CCFFCC" 
|22||W||November 24, 2001||5–3 || align="left"|  Phoenix Coyotes (2001–02) ||10–8–3–1 || 
|- align="center" bgcolor="#CCFFCC" 
|23||W||November 27, 2001||4–2 || align="left"|  Ottawa Senators (2001–02) ||11–8–3–1 || 
|- align="center" bgcolor="#CCFFCC" 
|24||W||November 29, 2001||3–1 || align="left"| @ Columbus Blue Jackets (2001–02) ||12–8–3–1 || 
|-

|- align="center" bgcolor="#CCFFCC" 
|25||W||December 1, 2001||4–3 || align="left"|  Columbus Blue Jackets (2001–02) ||13–8–3–1 || 
|- align="center" 
|26||T||December 2, 2001||4–4 OT|| align="left"| @ Minnesota Wild (2001–02) ||13–8–4–1 || 
|- align="center" bgcolor="#FFBBBB"
|27||L||December 5, 2001||0–3 || align="left"| @ Phoenix Coyotes (2001–02) ||13–9–4–1 || 
|- align="center" 
|28||T||December 6, 2001||1–1 OT|| align="left"| @ Los Angeles Kings (2001–02) ||13–9–5–1 || 
|- align="center" bgcolor="#CCFFCC" 
|29||W||December 8, 2001||2–0 || align="left"|  Los Angeles Kings (2001–02) ||14–9–5–1 || 
|- align="center" 
|30||T||December 12, 2001||2–2 OT|| align="left"| @ Chicago Blackhawks (2001–02) ||14–9–6–1 || 
|- align="center" bgcolor="#FF6F6F"
|31||OTL||December 13, 2001||3–4 OT|| align="left"|  Toronto Maple Leafs (2001–02) ||14–9–6–2 || 
|- align="center" bgcolor="#CCFFCC" 
|32||W||December 15, 2001||4–0 || align="left"|  Calgary Flames (2001–02) ||15–9–6–2 || 
|- align="center" bgcolor="#FFBBBB"
|33||L||December 18, 2001||3–6 || align="left"| @ Philadelphia Flyers (2001–02) ||15–10–6–2 || 
|- align="center" bgcolor="#FF6F6F"
|34||OTL||December 21, 2001||3–4 OT|| align="left"| @ Tampa Bay Lightning (2001–02) ||15–10–6–3 || 
|- align="center" bgcolor="#CCFFCC" 
|35||W||December 22, 2001||2–0 || align="left"| @ Florida Panthers (2001–02) ||16–10–6–3 || 
|- align="center" bgcolor="#FFBBBB"
|36||L||December 26, 2001||1–3 || align="left"|  Chicago Blackhawks (2001–02) ||16–11–6–3 || 
|- align="center" bgcolor="#CCFFCC" 
|37||W||December 28, 2001||3–0 || align="left"|  Montreal Canadiens (2001–02) ||17–11–6–3 || 
|- align="center" bgcolor="#CCFFCC" 
|38||W||December 30, 2001||7–2 || align="left"|  Nashville Predators (2001–02) ||18–11–6–3 || 
|-

|- align="center" bgcolor="#FFBBBB"
|39||L||January 1, 2002||1–2 || align="left"| @ New Jersey Devils (2001–02) ||18–12–6–3 || 
|- align="center" bgcolor="#CCFFCC" 
|40||W||January 3, 2002||4–2 || align="left"|  Columbus Blue Jackets (2001–02) ||19–12–6–3 || 
|- align="center" bgcolor="#CCFFCC" 
|41||W||January 5, 2002||5–2 || align="left"|  Dallas Stars (2001–02) ||20–12–6–3 || 
|- align="center" bgcolor="#CCFFCC" 
|42||W||January 8, 2002||6–2 || align="left"| @ San Jose Sharks (2001–02) ||21–12–6–3 || 
|- align="center" bgcolor="#CCFFCC" 
|43||W||January 9, 2002||3–2 || align="left"| @ Mighty Ducks of Anaheim (2001–02) ||22–12–6–3 || 
|- align="center" bgcolor="#CCFFCC" 
|44||W||January 12, 2002||4–1 || align="left"| @ Pittsburgh Penguins (2001–02) ||23–12–6–3 || 
|- align="center" bgcolor="#CCFFCC" 
|45||W||January 15, 2002||3–2 || align="left"|  Edmonton Oilers (2001–02) ||24–12–6–3 || 
|- align="center" bgcolor="#CCFFCC" 
|46||W||January 17, 2002||5–4 || align="left"|  Vancouver Canucks (2001–02) ||25–12–6–3 || 
|- align="center" bgcolor="#CCFFCC" 
|47||W||January 19, 2002||2–1 OT|| align="left"|  Boston Bruins (2001–02) ||26–12–6–3 || 
|- align="center" bgcolor="#CCFFCC" 
|48||W||January 21, 2002||4–3 OT|| align="left"| @ Boston Bruins (2001–02) ||27–12–6–3 || 
|- align="center" bgcolor="#CCFFCC" 
|49||W||January 23, 2002||5–2 || align="left"| @ Buffalo Sabres (2001–02) ||28–12–6–3 || 
|- align="center" bgcolor="#FFBBBB"
|50||L||January 25, 2002||1–2 || align="left"| @ Chicago Blackhawks (2001–02) ||28–13–6–3 || 
|- align="center" bgcolor="#FFBBBB"
|51||L||January 26, 2002||2–5 || align="left"|  Detroit Red Wings (2001–02) ||28–14–6–3 || 
|- align="center" bgcolor="#FFBBBB"
|52||L||January 28, 2002||0–1 || align="left"|  Mighty Ducks of Anaheim (2001–02) ||28–15–6–3 || 
|- align="center" bgcolor="#CCFFCC" 
|53||W||January 30, 2002||4–1 || align="left"| @ Washington Capitals (2001–02) ||29–15–6–3 || 
|-

|- align="center" bgcolor="#FFBBBB"
|54||L||February 5, 2002||3–4 || align="left"| @ New York Islanders (2001–02) ||29–16–6–3 || 
|- align="center" bgcolor="#CCFFCC" 
|55||W||February 7, 2002||3–1 || align="left"|  Edmonton Oilers (2001–02) ||30–16–6–3 || 
|- align="center" bgcolor="#FFBBBB"
|56||L||February 9, 2002||0–5 || align="left"|  Philadelphia Flyers (2001–02) ||30–17–6–3 || 
|- align="center" bgcolor="#CCFFCC" 
|57||W||February 12, 2002||3–0 || align="left"|  Atlanta Thrashers (2001–02) ||31–17–6–3 || 
|- align="center" bgcolor="#FFBBBB"
|58||L||February 13, 2002||1–3 || align="left"| @ Colorado Avalanche (2001–02) ||31–18–6–3 || 
|- align="center" 
|59||T||February 26, 2002||4–4 OT|| align="left"| @ Vancouver Canucks (2001–02) ||31–18–7–3 || 
|- align="center" bgcolor="#FFBBBB"
|60||L||February 28, 2002||2–3 || align="left"| @ Calgary Flames (2001–02) ||31–19–7–3 || 
|-

|- align="center" 
|61||T||March 2, 2002||1–1 OT|| align="left"| @ Edmonton Oilers (2001–02) ||31–19–8–3 || 
|- align="center" bgcolor="#FFBBBB"
|62||L||March 7, 2002||0–3 || align="left"|  Minnesota Wild (2001–02) ||31–20–8–3 || 
|- align="center" bgcolor="#FFBBBB"
|63||L||March 9, 2002||2–5 || align="left"|  Detroit Red Wings (2001–02) ||31–21–8–3 || 
|- align="center" bgcolor="#FFBBBB"
|64||L||March 11, 2002||2–3 || align="left"|  Colorado Avalanche (2001–02) ||31–22–8–3 || 
|- align="center" bgcolor="#CCFFCC" 
|65||W||March 13, 2002||2–0 || align="left"| @ San Jose Sharks (2001–02) ||32–22–8–3 || 
|- align="center" bgcolor="#FFBBBB"
|66||L||March 14, 2002||1–2 || align="left"| @ Los Angeles Kings (2001–02) ||32–23–8–3 || 
|- align="center" bgcolor="#CCFFCC" 
|67||W||March 17, 2002||3–2 || align="left"| @ Mighty Ducks of Anaheim (2001–02) ||33–23–8–3 || 
|- align="center" bgcolor="#CCFFCC" 
|68||W||March 19, 2002||5–1 || align="left"|  Nashville Predators (2001–02) ||34–23–8–3 || 
|- align="center" bgcolor="#FFBBBB"
|69||L||March 20, 2002||2–3 || align="left"| @ Dallas Stars (2001–02) ||34–24–8–3 || 
|- align="center" bgcolor="#CCFFCC" 
|70||W||March 22, 2002||3–2 || align="left"|  Mighty Ducks of Anaheim (2001–02) ||35–24–8–3 || 
|- align="center" bgcolor="#FF6F6F"
|71||OTL||March 24, 2002||3–4 OT|| align="left"| @ Chicago Blackhawks (2001–02) ||35–24–8–4 || 
|- align="center" bgcolor="#FFBBBB"
|72||L||March 26, 2002||1–2 || align="left"|  Minnesota Wild (2001–02) ||35–25–8–4 || 
|- align="center" bgcolor="#CCFFCC" 
|73||W||March 28, 2002||4–1 || align="left"|  Buffalo Sabres (2001–02) ||36–25–8–4 || 
|- align="center" bgcolor="#CCFFCC" 
|74||W||March 30, 2002||4–2 || align="left"| @ Nashville Predators (2001–02) ||37–25–8–4 || 
|-

|- align="center" bgcolor="#FFBBBB"
|75||L||April 1, 2002||3–5 || align="left"| @ Phoenix Coyotes (2001–02) ||37–26–8–4 || 
|- align="center" bgcolor="#CCFFCC" 
|76||W||April 3, 2002||2–1 OT|| align="left"| @ Dallas Stars (2001–02) ||38–26–8–4 || 
|- align="center" bgcolor="#CCFFCC" 
|77||W||April 5, 2002||5–1 || align="left"|  Chicago Blackhawks (2001–02) ||39–26–8–4 || 
|- align="center" bgcolor="#FFBBBB"
|78||L||April 7, 2002||2–4 || align="left"|  Colorado Avalanche (2001–02) ||39–27–8–4 || 
|- align="center" bgcolor="#CCFFCC" 
|79||W||April 9, 2002||3–2 || align="left"|  Nashville Predators (2001–02) ||40–27–8–4 || 
|- align="center" bgcolor="#CCFFCC" 
|80||W||April 11, 2002||4–1 || align="left"|  San Jose Sharks (2001–02) ||41–27–8–4 || 
|- align="center" bgcolor="#CCFFCC" 
|81||W||April 13, 2002||3–2 OT|| align="left"|  Detroit Red Wings (2001–02) ||42–27–8–4 || 
|- align="center" bgcolor="#CCFFCC" 
|82||W||April 14, 2002||5–3 || align="left"| @ Detroit Red Wings (2001–02) ||43–27–8–4 || 
|-

|-
| Legend:

Playoffs

|- align="center" bgcolor="#FFBBBB"
| 1 ||L || April 18, 2002 || 1–2 || align="left"| Chicago Blackhawks || 18,807 || Blackhawks lead 1–0 || 
|- align="center" bgcolor="#CCFFCC"
| 2 ||W || April 20, 2002 || 2–0 || align="left"| Chicago Blackhawks || 19,143 || Series tied 1–1 || 
|- align="center" bgcolor="#CCFFCC" 
| 3 ||W || April 21, 2002 || 4–0 || align="left"| @ Chicago Blackhawks || 20,532 || Blues lead 2–1 || 
|- align="center" bgcolor="#CCFFCC"
| 4 ||W || April 23, 2002 || 1–0 || align="left"| @ Chicago Blackhawks || 18,019 || Blues lead 3–1 || 
|- align="center" bgcolor="#CCFFCC"
| 5 ||W || April 25, 2002 || 5–3 || align="left"| Chicago Blackhawks || 19,999 || Blues win 4–1 || 
|-

|- align="center" bgcolor="#FFBBBB"
| 1 ||L || May 2, 2002 || 0–2 || align="left"| @ Detroit Red Wings || 20,058 || Red Wings lead 1–0 || 
|- align="center" bgcolor="#FFBBBB"
| 2 ||L || May 4, 2002 || 2–3 || align="left"| @ Detroit Red Wings || 20,058 || Red Wings lead 2–0 || 
|- align="center" bgcolor="#CCFFCC" 
| 3 ||W || May 7, 2002 || 6–1 || align="left"| Detroit Red Wings || 19,107 || Red Wings lead 2–1 || 
|- align="center" bgcolor="#FFBBBB"
| 4 ||L || May 9, 2002 || 3–4 || align="left"| Detroit Red Wings || 19,999 || Red Wings lead 3–1 || 
|- align="center" bgcolor="#FFBBBB"
| 5 ||L || May 11, 2002 || 0–4 || align="left"| @ Detroit Red Wings || 20,058 || Red Wings win 4–1 || 
|-

|-
| Legend:

Player statistics

Scoring
 Position abbreviations: C = Center; D = Defense; G = Goaltender; LW = Left Wing; RW = Right Wing
  = Joined team via a transaction (e.g., trade, waivers, signing) during the season. Stats reflect time with the Blues only.
  = Left team via a transaction (e.g., trade, waivers, release) during the season. Stats reflect time with the Blues only.

Goaltending

Awards and records

Transactions
The Blues were involved in the following transactions from June 10, 2001, the day after the deciding game of the 2001 Stanley Cup Finals, through June 13, 2002, the day of the deciding game of the 2002 Stanley Cup Finals.

Trades

Players acquired

Players lost

Signings

Draft picks
St. Louis's draft picks at the 2001 NHL Entry Draft held at the National Car Rental Center in Sunrise, Florida.

See also
2001–02 NHL season

Notes

References

St. Louis
St. Louis
St. Louis Blues seasons
St
St